The 2014 UAB Blazers football team represented the University of Alabama at Birmingham (UAB) in the 2014 NCAA Division I FBS football season as a member of the East Division of Conference USA (C-USA). They were led by first year head coach Bill Clark and played their home games at Legion Field in Birmingham, Alabama.

After defeating Southern Miss in the final regular season game on November 29, 2014, UAB became bowl eligible for the first time since 2004. Three days later, UAB president Ray Watts announced that the Southern Miss victory would be the last for the program; the university would not field a team after 2014. Despite the troubles following the year, the season itself was viewed as a success. The Blazers boasted one of the best Special Teams units in the country (led by Special Teams Coordinator Daric Riley), became bowl eligible for the first time in years, and Bill Clark won the Conference USA Coach of the Year award. Nonetheless, they became the first FBS team to stop sponsoring football since the Pacific Tigers.

Despite being bowl eligible, UAB was not invited to a bowl game.

On June 1, 2015, Watts announced they were beginning the process to reinstate football, and the program was reinstated for the 2017 season.

Schedule

Game summaries

Troy

Mississippi State

Alabama A&M

FIU

WKU

North Texas

Middle Tennessee

Arkansas

Florida Atlantic

Louisiana Tech

Marshall

Southern Miss

References

UAB
UAB Blazers football seasons
UAB Blazers football